Don Pío de Jesús Pico (May 5, 1801 – September 11, 1894) was a Californio politician, ranchero, and entrepreneur, famous for serving as the last governor of Alta California under Mexican rule. A member of the prominent Pico family of California, he was one of the wealthiest men in California at the time and a hugely influential figure in Californian society, continuing as a citizen of the nascent U.S. state of California. His legacy can be seen in the numerous places named after him, such as the city of Pico Rivera, Pico Boulevard in Los Angeles, Pio Pico State Historic Park, and numerous schools that bear his name.

Early years

Pico, a member of the prominent Pico family of California, was born at Mission San Gabriel Arcángel to José María Pico and his wife María Eustaquia Gutiérrez, with the aid of midwife Eulalia Pérez de Guillén Mariné. His paternal grandmother, María Jacinta de la Bastida, was listed in the 1790 census as mulata, meaning mixed-race with African ancestry. His paternal grandfather, Santiago de la Cruz Pico, was described as a mestizo (Native American-Spanish) in the same census. Santiago de la Cruz Pico was one of the soldiers who accompanied Juan Bautista de Anza on the expedition that left Tubac, Arizona for California in 1775 to explore the region and colonize it. Pio Pico and his siblings were thus of African, Native American, and Spanish ancestry.

Marriage and family
After the death of his father in 1819, Pico settled in San Diego, California. A Catholic, he married María Ignacia Alvarado at La Iglesia de Nuestra Señora la Reina de los Ángeles on February 24, 1834. 

His younger brother was General Andrés Pico.

Politics
Pico twice served as Governor of Alta California, taking office the first time from Manuel Victoria in 1832, when Victoria was deposed for refusing to follow through with orders to secularize the mission properties. As governor pro tem and "Vocal" of the Departmental Assembly, Pico began secularization. After 20 days in office, he abdicated in favor of Zamorano and Echeandía, who governed the north and south, respectively, until José Figueroa reunified the governorship in 1833.

Pico ran for office in 1834 as the first alcalde (magistrate) of San Diego after secularization of the mission but was defeated. He challenged Governor Juan Bautista Alvarado (1836-1842) on political issues and was imprisoned on several occasions.

In 1844, he was chosen as a leader of the California Assembly. In 1845, he was again appointed governor, succeeding the unpopular Manuel Micheltorena.

This occurred because, in late 1844, the Mexican province of California staged a revolt against the mother country. Micheltorena had been sent to California from Mexico, along with an army that had been recruited out of Mexico's worst jails. He had no money to feed his army, which then spread out to people's homes and farms "like a plague of locusts, stripping the countryside bare." This enraged the Californians and led to widespread hatred of Micheltorena. Women were not considered safe from the depredations of Micheltorena's army.

Juan Bautista Alvarado, the governor who had been forcibly replaced by Micheltorena, organized a rebellion against Micheltorena. Upon learning of the impending revolt, Micheltorena appointed John Sutter to lead troops in opposition. Sutter came to John Marsh, who had one of the largest ranchos in California, hoping he would join. Marsh wanted no part of it, but Sutter forced him to join his army against his will.

The two forces met in Cahuenga Pass, near Los Angeles, and fought the Battle of Providencia (also known as the Second Battle of Cahuenga Pass), which consisted primarily of an artillery duel. On the long march to the battle Marsh had taken every opportunity to dissuade the other soldiers from Micheltorena’s cause. Ignoring Sutter, Marsh seized an opportunity in the battle to signal the other side for a parley. Many of the soldiers on each side were immigrants from the United States. Marsh convinced them that they had no reason to be fighting each other. At Marsh's urging, these soldiers on both sides united, abandoned Micheltorena's cause, and even captured Sutter. Micheltorena was defeated, and California-born Pio Pico was returned to the governorship.

Pico made Los Angeles the province's capital. In the year leading up to the Mexican–American War, Pico advocated that California achieve independence from Mexico and become a British protectorate.

When U.S. troops occupied Los Angeles and San Diego in 1846 during the Mexican–American War, Pico fled to Baja California, Mexico, to argue before the Mexican Congress for sending troops to defend Alta California. Pico did not return to Los Angeles until after the signing of the Treaty of Guadalupe Hidalgo, and he reluctantly accepted the transfer of sovereignty.

Automatically granted United States citizenship, he was elected to the Los Angeles Common Council in 1853, but he did not assume office.

Business life
John Bidwell, an early California settler, mentioned Pico among the people he knew:
 
Los Angeles I first saw in March 1845. It then had probably 250 people, of whom I recall Don Abel Stearns, John Temple, Captain Alexander Bell, William Wolfskill, Lemuel Carpenter, David W. Alexander; also of Mexicans, Pio Pico (governor), Don Juan Bandini, and others.

By the 1850s Pico was one of the richest men in Alta California. In 1850 he purchased the  Rancho Paso de Bartolo, which included half of present-day Whittier. Two years later, he built a home on the ranch and lived there until 1892. It is preserved today as Pio Pico State Historic Park.

In 1868, he constructed the three-story, 33-room hotel, Pico House (Casa de Pico) on the old plaza of Los Angeles, opposite today's Olvera Street. At the time of its opening in 1869, it was the most lavish hotel in Southern California. Even before 1900, however, both the hotel and the surrounding neighborhood had begun to decline, as the business center moved farther south. After decades as a shabby flophouse, the hotel was deeded to the State of California in 1953. It is now a part of El Pueblo de Los Angeles State Historic Monument. It is used on occasion for exhibits and special events.

Later life 
Following the American annexation of California, Pico dedicated himself to his businesses.

He survived the American conquest of California, becoming one of the wealthiest California cattlemen, controlling more than a quarter million acres. He defended his position and fortune in over 100 legal cases, including 20 that were argued before the California Supreme Court.

However, gambling, losses to loan sharks, bad business practices, being a victim of fraud, and the flood of 1883 ruined him financially. For example, in 1893, Pico made an arrangement with Bernard Cohn in which Cohn paid Pico more than $60,000 in exchange for a deed to Pico's property in Los Angeles and elsewhere in the county. Pico sued Cohn, but lost on appeal. The decision, Pico v. Cohn (1891) 91 Cal. 129, 133-134, is classically cited by California appellate courts in cases having to do with the setting aside of a judgment in case of fraud.

Pico was forced to liquidate his real estate holdings and his final years were spent in near poverty. In 1893, a committee of local boosters and history enthusiasts asked him to appear at the Chicago World's Columbian Exposition as "the last of the California "dons". Pico refused, considering it an affront to his dignity. He died in 1894 at the home of his daughter, Joaquina Pico Moreno, in Los Angeles. He was buried in the old Calvary Cemetery on North Broadway in Downtown Los Angeles, but his remains, as well as those of his wife, were relocated in 1921 to a modest tomb in El Campo Santo Cemetery, now in the Homestead Museum in the City of Industry.

Pico held three different nationalities during his lifetime. He was born a Spaniard in New Spain, became a Mexican citizen as a young man, and finally a United States citizen. He was known for his extravagant lifestyle, with fine clothes, expensive furnishings, and heavy gambling.

Legacy

In 1927, Pío Pico State Historic Park was created from the ruins of his Rancho de Bartolo (El Ranchito) in Whittier, and Casa Pico mansion. Pico Boulevard, a major east–west thoroughfare in Los Angeles, is named for him. An elementary and middle school in Los Angeles' Mid-City district is also named in his honor. Pico Rivera, a city located in southeastern Los Angeles County, is named for the last Mexican governor.

In 2010, scientists published an article about Pio Pico asserting that he showed signs of acromegaly, a disease not characterized until later in the nineteenth century.

See also
Pio Pico State Historic Park
Andrés Pico

References

Further reading

External links

Biography from the San Diego Historical Society excerpted from Smythe's History of San Diego (1907)
"What made Pio Pico so, well, ugly?" - Los Angeles Times
"Pio Pico" - Whittier Museum
"The Life and Times of Pío Pico, Last Governor of Mexican California" - KCET

Pío Pico papers, 1845-1846 at The Bancroft Library
 , C-SPAN Video Library

1801 births
1894 deaths
19th century in Los Angeles
19th-century Mexican people
19th-century Roman Catholics
Californios
Ranchers from California
Governors of Mexican California
Hispanic and Latino American politicians
History of Los Angeles
Land owners from California
Mexican people of Italian descent
Mexican people of the Bear Flag Revolt
Mexican people of the Mexican–American War
Mexican Roman Catholics
People of the Conquest of California
People of Mexican California
People from San Gabriel, California
People with acromegaly
Catholics from California
19th-century American businesspeople
Afro-Mexican
Mexican people of African descent
Spanish people of African descent
African-American Catholics
Mexican-American people in California politics